Viktor Hennadiyovych Ruban (born 24 May 1981 in Kharkiv, Ukrainian SSR, Soviet Union) is an Olympic gold medal winning former world number one Ukrainian archer.

2004 Summer Olympics
Ruban competed at the 2004 Summer Olympics in men's individual archery.  He won his first match, advancing to the round of 32; he also won his second match, advancing to the round of 16.  In the third match, he lost to Laurence Godfrey of Great Britain.  Ruban placed 13th overall. Ruban was also a member of the bronze medal Ukrainian men's archery team at the 2004 Summer Olympics.

2008 Summer Olympics
At the 2008 Summer Olympics in Beijing Ruban finished his ranking round with a total of 678 points, just one point behind Juan René Serrano and equal with Mangal Singh Champia. This gave him the third seed for the final competition bracket in which he faced Maged Youssef in the first round, beating the Egyptian 111-96. In the second round Ruban was too strong for Michael Naray (115-105) and via Jacek Proć (114-108) in the third round he advanced to the quarter finals. There he had no problem beating Moriya Ryuichi 115-106. In the semi final he and his opponent Bair Badënov both came to 112 points and an extra round was needed. Here Ruban scored 20 points and Badënov 18, which brought Ruban into the final. In the final he claimed the gold by beating Park Kyung-Mo by 113-112.

Together with Markiyan Ivashko and Oleksandr Serdyuk he also took part in the team event. With the highest score from the ranking round combined with the 676 of Serdyuk and the 658 of Ivashko Ukraine were in second position after the ranking round, which gave them a straight seed into the quarter finals. With 214-211 they were too strong for the Chinese Taipei team, but in the semi final they were eliminated by Italy 223-221. In the challenge for the bronze medal China was too strong with 222-219.

Individual performance timeline

External links
 
 
 

1981 births
Living people
Sportspeople from Kharkiv
Ukrainian male archers
Archers at the 2004 Summer Olympics
Archers at the 2008 Summer Olympics
Archers at the 2012 Summer Olympics
Archers at the 2016 Summer Olympics
Olympic archers of Ukraine
Olympic gold medalists for Ukraine
Olympic bronze medalists for Ukraine
Olympic medalists in archery
Medalists at the 2008 Summer Olympics
Medalists at the 2004 Summer Olympics
Archers at the 2015 European Games
European Games medalists in archery
European Games gold medalists for Ukraine
World Archery Championships medalists
Universiade medalists in archery
Universiade gold medalists for Ukraine
Medalists at the 2005 Summer Universiade
Medalists at the 2009 Summer Universiade